van Overbeek is a surname. Notable people with the surname include:

Bonaventura van Overbeek (1660–1705), Dutch Golden Age draughtsman and engraver
Elvio van Overbeek (born 1994), Dutch footballer
Johannes van Overbeek (born 1973), American racing driver

Surnames of Dutch origin